The Wilingura otherwise known as the Wilangarra, were an indigenous Australian people of the Northern Territory.

Country
The Wilingura inhabited the land between the Cox River and Nutwood Downs.

Alternative names
 Willongera
 Leewillungarra
 Willangan
 Wilungwara
 Wilinggura

Notes

Citations

Sources

Aboriginal peoples of the Northern Territory